Radical 127 or radical plough meaning "plough" is one of the 29 Kangxi radicals (214 radicals in total) composed of 6 strokes.

In the Kangxi Dictionary, there are 84 characters (out of 49,030) to be found under this radical.

 is also the 122nd indexing component in the Table of Indexing Chinese Character Components predominantly adopted by Simplified Chinese dictionaries published in mainland China.

Evolution

Derived characters

Variant forms
Traditionally, the first stroke of this radical character is a right-to-left slash. In Simplified Chinese xin zixing, it becomes a horizontal stroke. A similar change was also applied to Japanese jōyō kanji, while hyōgai kanji remain unchanged.

Literature

References

External links

Unihan Database - U+8012

127
122